Micropentila victoriae, the Victoria dots, is a butterfly in the family Lycaenidae. It is found in the Democratic Republic of the Congo (Ituri and North Kivu), Uganda, western Kenya and north-western Tanzania. The habitat consists of primary forests.

References

Butterflies described in 1965
Poritiinae